Sir Herbert Brent Grotrian, 1st Baronet,  (1870 – 28 October 1951) was an English Member of Parliament from 1924 to 1929 who was created a baronet in 1934.

Educated at Rossall School and Trinity College, Oxford, Grotrian was the second son of Frederick Brent Grotrian of Ingmanthorpe Hall, Wetherby, and of West Hill House, Hessle, near Hull, Conservative Member of Parliament for Kingston upon Hull East from 1886 to 1892, and himself represented Kingston upon Hull South West in the House of Commons as a Conservative, 1924–1929.

He was appointed a King's Counsel in 1925, was High Sheriff of Bedfordshire, 1931–32, and was a member of the United University Club. Grotrian was created a baronet 'of Leighton Buzzard in the County of Bedford' on 28 June 1934.

In retirement, he lived in the Bahamas.

Grotrian was succeeded in the title by his only surviving son, Sir Joseph Appelbe Brent Grotrian, 2nd Baronet (1904–1984). His other two sons were killed on active service.

References

GROTRIAN, Sir Herbert Brent in Who Was Who 1897-2006 online, Retrieved 1 March 2008 from GROTRIAN, Sir Herbert Brent (subscription required), also published in book form in Who Was Who 1951–1960 (London, A. & C. Black, 1984 reprint)
Kidd, Charles, Williamson, David (editors). Debrett's Peerage and Baronetage (1990 edition). New York: St Martin's Press, 1990.

1870 births
1951 deaths
Alumni of Trinity College, Oxford
People educated at Rossall School
Baronets in the Baronetage of the United Kingdom
Members of the Parliament of the United Kingdom for English constituencies
UK MPs 1924–1929
Deputy Lieutenants of Hertfordshire
High Sheriffs of Bedfordshire
English King's Counsel